Séamus Power (born 1952 in Boherlahan, County Tipperary, Ireland) is an Irish former hurler who played for his local club Boherlahan–Dualla and at senior level for the Tipperary county team from 1971 until 1986.

References

1952 births
Living people
Boherlahan-Dualla hurlers
Dual players
Hurling forwards
Hurling managers
Tipperary inter-county hurlers
Tipperary inter-county Gaelic footballers